The ETAP 26s is a Belgian trailerable sailboat that was designed by Marc-Oliver von Ahlen as a cruiser and first built in 2005.

The design was Sail magazine's Yacht of the Year in 2017.

Production
The design has been built by ETAP Yachting in Belgium since 2005. It remained advertised as still in production in 2021.

Design
The ETAP 26s is a recreational keelboat, built predominantly of glassfibre, with wood trim. The construction is of a polyester glassfibre and closed-cell polyurethane foam sandwich, which provides buoyancy and makes the boat unsinkable. It has a fractional sloop rig with a bowsprit; a plumb stem; a vertical, walk-through transom; dual, canted, transom-hung rudders controlled by a tiller and a fixed fin keel or optional shoal draft dual keels. The fin keel version displaces  and carries  of lead ballast, while the dual keel version displaces  and carries  of ballast.

The boat is fitted with a Japanese Yanmar diesel engine or a small outboard motor for docking and manoeuvring.

The design has sleeping accommodation for four people, with a double "V"-berth in the bow cabin and two straight settees in the main cabin. The galley is located on both sides, just aft of the bow cabin. The galley is equipped with a two-burner stove and a sink. The head is located in the bow cabin on the port side.

Operational history
The boat was at one time supported by a class club, the ETAP Owners Association.

A iNautia review reported, "right from its launch, the ETAP 26s was a trendsetter, with its safe, deep cockpit, the flowing lines of its cabin sofas, the recessed foredeck hatch and much more."

See also
List of sailing boat types

References

External links

Keelboats
1980s sailboat type designs
Sailing yachts
Trailer sailers
Sailboat type designs by Marc-Oliver von Ahlen
Sailboat types built by ETAP Yachting